Emam Kandi (also Romanized as Emām Kandī) is a village in Sojas Rud Rural District, Sojas Rud District, Khodabandeh County, Zanjan Province, Iran. At the 2006 census, its population was 318, in 72 families.

References 

Populated places in Khodabandeh County